Briana Middleton is an American actress, singer and songwriter.

Early life
Middleton is an alumna of The Ensworth School. She studied drama at Carnegie Mellon University and the University of North Carolina School of the Arts.

Career
Middleton's acting career began ramping up in 2021, when she was cast in George Clooney's drama The Tender Bar, The Last Will and Testament of Charles Abernathy, and Sharper co-starring Julianne Moore. She had also cast in a lead role in the Disney+ series Little Town, which will serve as a prequel to the 2017 Beauty and the Beast adaptation, however, the series was delayed indefinitely in February 2022.

In February 2023, she was cast to star in Metropolis, a miniseries adaptation of Thea von Harbou's science fiction novel that will be directed and written by Sam Esmail.

Personal life
Middleton grew up in a military family, and lived in Germany, Tennessee and Louisiana. She currently lives in New Orleans.

Filmography

Film

References

External links

Year of birth missing (living people)
African-American actresses
American actresses
Carnegie Mellon University alumni
University of North Carolina School of the Arts alumni
Living people